Kolešovice is a municipality and village in Rakovník District in the Central Bohemian Region of the Czech Republic. It has about 800 inhabitants.

Administrative parts
Villages of Heřmanov and Zderaz are administrative parts of Kolešovice.

Geography
It lies in an agricultural landscape in the Rakovník Uplands. The Kolešovický Stream flows through the municipality.

History
The first written mention of Kolešovice is from 1318. The most notable owners of the village were the Kolowrat family, who held it from 1375 to 1541, and the Wallis family, who bought the estate in 1720 and owned it until 1945.

Sights
The local fortress from the 14th century was rebuilt into a Renaissance residence in the mid-16th century, but it burned down in 1707. In 1724, a new aristocrastic residence, today called Old Castle, was built. The New Castle was built next to it after 1744. Today the pseudo-Renaissance buildings houses a retirement home.

The Church of Saints Peter and Paul is the second landmark of Kolešovice. It was first mentioned in 1352. The current Baroque church was built in 1706–1708.

References

External links

Villages in Rakovník District